Magtu may refer to:
 Magtu, Ahvaz
 Magtu, Karun

See also
 Maqtu (disambiguation)